József Szabó (born 1969) is a Hungarian Olympic swimmer.

József Szabó or Joseph Szabo may also refer to:
József Szabó (footballer, born 1896) (1896–1973), Hungarian football player
József Szabó (footballer, born 1956) (born 1956), Hungarian football player
Yozhef Sabo (born 1940), Soviet football player of Hungarian descent
József Szabó de Szentmiklós (1822–1894), Hungarian geologist
Joseph Szabo (photographer) (born 1944), American photographer
Joseph Szabo (painter) (1925–2010), Hungarian painter
Joseph C. Szabo (born 1957), American railroad administrator